Actors who frequently worked with film director Preston Sturges:

Sturges, Preston
Sturges, Preston